Simeon Soumaine (before June 10, 1685 –  1750) was a noted Huguenot-American silversmith, active in New York City.

Soumaine was born in London, christened there on June 10, 1685, and probably trained there. He had emigrated to New York by 1717, as William Anderson Jr., was apprenticed to him on February 17, 1717, for 7 years, with that fact signed a year later, and finally recorded in August 1719. Elias Pelletreau (1726–1810) was also an apprentice for seven years, dating from January 12, 1741. Soumaine married Susanna Bourdett in New York City and is known to have owned at least one slave. In 1741, when the "Negro Plot of 1741" threatened, his slave Tom told authorities that the conspirators asked him to get swords from his master's shop. Two years later, Soumaine advertised that a pepper box had been stolen.

Soumaine advertised a lottery of his works in the American Weekly Mercury, March 23, 1727, as follows:
This is to give Notice to all Gentlemen and others, That a Lottery is to be drawn at Mr John Stevens in Perth Amboy for £501 of Silver and Gold work wrought by Simeon Soumain of New York, Gold-Smith, all of the newest Fashion. The highest Prize consists of an Eight square Tea Pot, six Tea Spoons, Skimmer and Tongues, Valued at £18 3s 6d. The lowest Prize consists of Twelve Shillings Value. There is 278 Prizes in all, and their is only five Blank to each Prize. Tickets are given out at Six Shillings York money or Seven Shillings Jersey Money for each Ticket at the House of Mr John Stevens in Amboy, at Mr Lewis Carrees in Aliens Town, at Mr Jolines in Elizabeth Town, at Mr Cortlandts at Second River, by Mr Andrew Bradford in Philadelphia, at Mr Samuel Clowse in Jamaica in Long Island, and by Simeon Soumain in the City of New York, at which last Place, the Goods so to be drawn are to be seen, and the said Goods are to be valued and apprised by Mr Peter Van Dyke, and Mr Charles Leroux, two GoldSmiths in the city of New York. And said Lottery is to be drawn the 22nd day of May next anno. 1727. If said Lottery be full sooner it will be drawn before the 22nd of May next.

His work is collected in the Brooklyn Museum, Clark Art Institute, Fine Arts Museums of San Francisco, Harvard Art Museums/The Fogg, Metropolitan Museum of Art, Museum of Fine Arts, Boston, National Museum of American History, New-York Historical Society, Winterthur Museum, and Yale University Art Gallery.

References 
 "Simeon Soumaine", American Silversmiths.
 "Simeon Soumaine", Sterling Flatware Fashions.
 The Huguenot Home: Consumption Practices and Identity in Early 18th-Century New York City, Theodor M. Maghrak, University of Massachusetts Boston, August 2013. pp. 50–53.
 Collections, Volume XLII, New-York Historical Society, 1909, pages 124–125.
 Becoming America, Jon Butler, Harvard University Press, 2001, pages 156–157.
 Elias Pelletreau: Long Island Silversmith and Entrepreneur, 1726-1810, Dean F. Failey, with contributions by Jennifer L. Anderson, Deborah Dependahl Waters, and David L. Barquist, Preservation Long Island, 2018.

American silversmiths